Enrique Ramil (born 18 June 1984 in Ares, La Coruña) is a Spanish singer, musician, song-writer and vocal coach. He is internationally well-known because of the quality of his voice and performance. and has performed in Spain, Latin America and United States.

Discography

Albums

EP

Singles

Collaborations

Soundtracks 
 Believe in Love (Tercera Planta), Pride Barcelona 2012 official anthem.

Videoclips

References 

Discographies of Spanish artists